Zenzontepec Chatino, also known as Northern Chatino, or "Chatino Occidental Alto" is an indigenous Mesoamerican language, one of the Chatino family of the Oto-Manguean languages. It is not intelligible with other Chatino languages. It is spoken by one of the most isolated groups in Oaxaca, the Chatino people in the municipalities of Santa Cruz Zenzontepec and San Jacinto Tlacotepec, and in the former municipality of Santa María Tlapanalquiahuitl.

Phonology 
Zenzontepec Chatino has 5 vowels: /a, e, i, o, u/. Vowels may be oral or nasal, and there is a contrast between short and long vowels.

Stops and affricates are voiced when preceded by a nasal consonant, but are otherwise voiceless. 

Zenzontepec Chatino has predictable stem-final stress. 

In native vocabulary, the only permissible coda is the glottal stop. Phonological evidence, including evidence from a play language, suggests that the glottal stop of word-medial ʔC clusters belongs to the onset of the following syllable rather than the coda of the preceding syllable, and therefore true codas are only found word-finally.

Tone 
Zenzontepec Chatino's tone bearing unit is the mora, and each mora may be assigned a mid tone /M/, a high tone /H/, or be unspecified for tone /Ø/. In practical orthographies, tones are often indicated by accents over vowels: acute accents for /H/ tones, macrons or grave accents for /M/ tones, and no accent if tone is unspecified. 

On words with two or more moras (polysyllabic words or monosyllabic words with long vowels) different combinations of tones can be found (/ØØ/, /ØM/, /MH/, /HØ/, and /HM/), some of which are morphologically specialized (/ØH/ and /MM/ which only appear on words inflected for second person singular), while others do not occur (/MØ/ and /HH/).

Tone processes 
The high tone /H/ (but not the mid tone /M/) will spread through following toneless moras until coming into contact another /H/ or /M/ tone or the end of an intonational phrase. The /M/ or /H/ tones that the spreading /H/ tone runs in to will be downstepped phonetically, but will remain /M/ or /H/ phonologically. /M/ tones on monomoraic enclitics will become /H/ tones if its host's tone is /M/ or /ØM/.

Play language 
Speakers of Zenzontepec Chatino formerly used a play language called nchakwiɁ tsūɁ ntīlú 'speaking backwards' in which a word's first syllable was transposed to the end of the word, and its tones were replaced with /HØ/.

References

External links 
Chatino Indian Language at native-languages.org
OLAC resources in and about the Zenzontepec Chatino language

Chatino languages